Bnei Eilat Football Club is an Israeli football club based in Eilat. They are currently in Liga Alef South division.

History
Bnei Eilat were founded in 2006 and are not related to the football clubs which have previously operated in Eilat, Hapoel Eilat and A.S. Eilat.

In their first season of existence, the club won Liga Gimel South-Central division and promoted to Liga Bet. In the 2009–10 season, the club won Liga Bet South B division with a margin of 14 points, and promoted to Liga Alef. The following season, was the best season in the club history, after they finished third in Liga Alef South, and qualified for the promotion play-offs, where they lost 2–3 to Maccabi Kabilio Jaffa, after a late goal. In the 2013–14 season, the club finished bottom in Liga Alef South and relegated to Liga Bet. However, in the following season, the club won Liga Bet South B division and made an immediate return to Liga Alef.

Honours

League

Cups

See also
Hapoel Eilat

References

External links
Bnei Eilat Israel Football Association 

Association football clubs established in 2006
Eilat
Sport in Eilat
2006 establishments in Israel
Arab-Israeli football clubs